Wild Wales is a television documentary presented by Iolo Williams and produced by the BBC. A total of three hour-long episodes were filmed over a year in a range of locations in Wales, including Snowdonia, Anglesey and the Brecon Beacons.

The show aired on BBC Two in 2010.

Episodes 
 "The Beautiful South"
 "The Heart of Wales"
 "The Rugged North West"

Merchandise 
A three-disc DVD set of the series was released on 9 April 2012.

References

2010s Welsh television series
BBC Cymru Wales television shows